Events in the year 1986 in the Republic of India.

Incumbents
 President of India – Zail Singh
 Prime Minister of India – Rajiv Gandhi
 Chief Justice of India – Prafullachandra Natwarlal Bhagwati (until 20 December), Raghunandan Swarup Pathak

Governors
 Andhra Pradesh – Kumud Ben Joshi 
 Assam – Bhishma Narain Singh
 Bihar – P. Venkatasubbaiah 
 Gujarat – Braj Kumar Nehru (until 26 February), Ram Krishna Trivedi (starting 26 February)
 Haryana – Saiyid Muzaffar Husain Burney  
 Himachal Pradesh – 
 until 7 March: Hokishe Sema  
 7 March-16 April: Prabodh Dinkarrao Desai
 starting 16 April: R. K. S. Ghandhi
 Jammu and Kashmir – Jagmohan Malhotra 
 Karnataka – Ashoknath Banerji 
 Kerala – P. Ramachandran 
 Madhya Pradesh – K.M Chandy 
 Maharashtra – Kona Prabhakara Rao (until 2 April), Shankar Dayal Sharma (starting 2 April)
 Manipur – K. V. Krishna Rao 
 Meghalaya – Bhishma Narain Singh 
 Nagaland – K. V. Krishna Rao 
 Odisha – Bishambhar Nath Pande 
 Punjab – Shankar Dayal Sharma (until 2 April), Siddhartha Shankar Ray (starting 2 April)
 Rajasthan – Vasantdada Patil
 Sikkim – T.V. Rajeswar
 Tamil Nadu – Sundar Lal Khurana 
 Tripura – K. V. Krishna Rao 
 Uttar Pradesh – Mohammed Usman Arif 
 West Bengal – Uma Shankar Dikshit (until 12 August), Saiyid Nurul Hasan (starting 12 August)

Events
 National income - 3,183,659 million
 March 24 - Contract signed between the Government of India and Swedish arms company Bofors for supply of 410 155 mm Howitzer field guns. (Bofors deal)
 April 1 – VSNL incorporated
 April 30 – Operation Black Thunder conducted to flush out remaining Sikh extremists from the Golden Temple
 May – a new National Policy on Education announced by the Government
 June – Zion Matriculation Higher Secondary School is founded.
 August 11 - Supreme Court of India delivered landmark judgement which upholds Freedom of speech and expression in Bijoe Emmanuel Vs State of Kerala case. In this case court said that no law mandates singing National Anthem of India compulsory.
 September 22 – Australia-India test cricket match ends in a tie at the M. A. Chidambaram Stadium, Chepauk, Chennai, becoming only the second tied test in the history.
 October 27 – Inland Waterways Authority of India came into existence.
 November 18 – Operation Brasstacks starts in Rajasthan.
 November – 182-day Treasury Bill introduced

Law
 November 19 – Environment Protection Act that was passed in month of May in consequence to Bhopal disaster, came into force.
 December 24 – Consumer Protection Act

Births
 5 January – Deepika Padukone, actress.
8 January  Yash, actor.
15 January  Vikram Prabhu, actor.
 21 January – Sushant Singh Rajput, actor.
28 January  Shruti Haasan, actress and singer.
 4 February – Asif Ali, actor.
 27 February – Shishir Hathwar, Guinness World Record holder.
14 March  Lokesh Kanagaraj, film director.
 6 June – Bhavana (actress), actress.
 17 September – Ravichandran Ashwin, cricketer.
 28 July – Dulquer Salmaan, actor
21 September  Atlee Kumar, film director.
 2 October – Praveen Kumar, cricketer.
 17 October – T. V. Anupama, Indian Administrative Service officer.
28 October  Aditi Rao Hydari, actress and dancer.
 15 November – Sania Mirza, tennis player.
23 November  Naga Chaitanya, actor.
 27 November – Suresh Raina, cricketer.

Deaths
 6 July – Jagjivan Ram, freedom fighter and social reformer (born 1908).
 13 December – Smita Patil, actress (born 1955).

See also 
 Bollywood films of 1986

References

 
India
Years of the 20th century in India
1980s in India
India